Handley Hill is a peak,  high, standing  west of Auger Hill in the Keble Hills of the Scott Coast, Victoria Land, Antarctica. It was named by the New Zealand Geographic Board (1994) after W.R.C. Handley, Ph.D. supervisor to Laurence Greenfield, who proposed the name.

References

Hills of Victoria Land
Scott Coast